Maqabah (Arabic: مقابة. Mgaba) is a village in Bahrain.

Populated places in the Northern Governorate, Bahrain